Deon Apps (born 12 October 1987) is an Australian  former professional rugby league footballer who played for the South Sydney Rabbitohs in the National Rugby League.

Background
Deon Apps was born in Bega, New South Wales, Australia.

Playing career
Apps made his National Rugby League debut during round 12 of the 2011 NRL season against the Penrith Panthers. Apps played a total of 51 games for Norths after spending a majority of his time playing in the NSW Cup.

His junior club was the Bega Roosters and his nickname iPhone was given to him by club hooker Issac Luke. He is the older brother of Dragons, Blues and Jillaroos representative player Kezie Apps.

References

External links
NRL profile

1987 births
Living people
Australian rugby league players
North Sydney Bears NSW Cup players
Rugby league players from Bega, New South Wales
Rugby league second-rows
South Sydney Rabbitohs players